Marko's River is a river in North Macedonia. It rises in the chain of Jakupica at 1900 m above sea level, then descends to the northeast and flows into Vardar, at an altitude of 212 m. It crosses in particular the villages of Batinci, Markova Sušica and Dračevo. It flows into Vardar near the suburb of Gorno Lisiče, on the outskirts of Skopje.

Marko's River has a maximum depth of four meters. It is subject to summer drought and snowmelt in the spring, and therefore experiences a very different flow depending on the season. Its name, along with the village of Markova Sušica and Marko's Monastery, pays homage to Prince Marko. The river has great potential for irrigation.

References

Rivers of North Macedonia